St Sophia Greek Orthodox Church, officially the St Sophia and Her Three Daughters Greek Orthodox Church, is a heritage-listed Greek Orthodox church at 411a Bourke Street in the inner city Sydney suburb of  in the City of Sydney local government area of New South Wales, Australia. Formerly a Congregational church, the building is also known as the former Bourke Street Congregational Church and School.  It was added to the New South Wales State Heritage Register on 2 April 1999.

History 

The present building was designed by William Boles and opened in 1880. The church had existed since 1855, operating out of a portable iron structure transported from England; when the new church was built, the old structure was moved to Stewart St, Paddington.

By 1933, the church was struggling both in congregation size and finances as the area had ceased to be seen as fashionable, and was no longer able to afford a regular minister, with ministers instead provided by the Home Mission Board. The collection plate takings had diminished to "only a few shillings". During the 1930s, free meals were provided to unemployed men in the school hall, with 20,000 meals having been served between 1932 and 1935.

The church closed in the late 1930s. It was later leased by the Greek Orthodox Church, who then purchased it from the Congregational Church in the 1980s. It continues in operation today as the St Sophia Greek Orthodox Church. The original church pipe organ (1888) was transferred to the Galston Uniting Church in the 1980s, as it was no longer required under the new owners. The Galston Congregational Church Pipe Organ is separately listed on the New South Wales State Heritage Register.

Heritage listing 
Bourke Street Congregational Church and School was listed on the New South Wales State Heritage Register on 2 April 1999.

See also 

Greek Orthodox Archdiocese of Australia
Greek Orthodox churches in New South Wales
List of churches dedicated to Holy Wisdom

References

Bibliography

Attribution

External links

 
St Sophia & Three Daughters Greek Orthodox Church

Darlinghurst
New South Wales State Heritage Register sites located in Surry Hills
Churches in Sydney
Articles incorporating text from the New South Wales State Heritage Register
Churches completed in 1880
1880 establishments in Australia
Darlinghurst
Greek-Australian culture in New South Wales